Netherside Stream Outcrops is a  geological Site of Special Scientific Interest north-east of Haslemere in Surrey. It is a Geological Conservation Review site.

This is the Type locality for the Netherside Sand Member of the Weald Clay Group, dating to the Lower Cretaceous around 130 million years ago. Upward sloping sandstone has fossil Lycopodites plants in vertical life positions.

A public footpath runs through the site.

References

External links
Surrey County Council map of SSSIs

Sites of Special Scientific Interest in Surrey
Geological Conservation Review sites